Jean-François Leroy (24 September 1729 - 1791) was a French architect. For the Prince of Condé, he worked on the Château of Chantilly, the Palais Bourbon, and the Hôtel de Lassay, where he replaced  in 1780.

Biography 
Leroy was born in Chantilly, the son of Jean-Jacques Leroy, building inspector of the Prince of Condé, and Mary-Anne Dunu, daughter of the superintendent of the Château de Chantilly. He entered the service of the prince, following his father. In 1761, he married Toudouze Françoise-Thérèse, daughter of the prince's master of the hunt. He was appointed architect of the Château de Chantilly in 1768, upon the death of his predecessor, Brice Le Chauve.

In Chantilly, he built the Château d'Enghien (1769–1770) and the Hameau de Chantilly (1774–1775).

He worked with Claude Billard de Bélisard on the Palais Bourbon and the Hôtel de Lassay, and then succeeded him in about 1780. In 1782 he revised Bélisard's plan for the Place du Palais Bourbon.

With the landscaper Lecourt, he created the picturesque gardens of Betz-en-Multien for the Princess of Monaco, mistress of the Prince of Condé; all that remains is a prostyle Ionic temple of Love.

References

Sources 
 Michel Gallet, Les architectes parisiens du XVIIIe siècle, Paris, Éditions Mengès, 1995. 
 Gustave Macon, Les Arts dans la maison de Condé, Librairie de l’Art Ancien et Moderne, Paris  1903,
 C.-M. Dugas, "Une dynastie d'architectes, les Leroy", Bulletin de la Société d'histoire et d'archéologie de Senlis, 1959.

1729 births
1791 deaths
18th-century French architects
People from Chantilly, Oise
Jean-Francois